Crucible of Empire: The Spanish–American War is a 1999 television documentary film about the Spanish–American War and American imperialism at the turn of the 20th century. Produced by the Great Projects Film Company and South Carolina ETV for PBS, it details how the United States' imperial ambitions largely grew out of its war with the Spanish Empire and was the harbinger for the American Century. Directed by Daniel A. Miller, written and produced by Miller and Daniel B. Polin, and narrated by Edward James Olmos, the film first aired on PBS in the United States on August 23, 1999.

Voice cast
Edward James Olmos as the narrator
Larry Linville as Theodore Roosevelt
Laurence Luckinbill as William McKinley
Lou Diamond Phillips as Emilio Aguinaldo
Shawn Elliot as Máximo Gómez
Jeff DeMunn as Richard Harding Davis
Roger Pretto as Calixto García

Interviewees
Stephen Ambrose, historian
Robert L. Beisner, author of Twelve Against Empire
H.W. Brands, historian
Douglas Brinkley, historian
Maria Luisa T. Camagay, historian
Ada Ferrer, historian
John Gable, biographer of Theodore Roosevelt
Kevin K. Gaines, historian
Kristin L. Hoganson, gender historian
Ricardo T. Jose, military historian
Franklin W. Knight, Caribbean historian
Walter LaFeber, historian
Joyce Milton, author of The Yellow Kids
David Nasaw, biographer of William Randolph Hearst
G. J. A. O'Toole, historian
Louis A. Perez Jr., Cuban historian
Cesar Aguinaldo Virata, grand-nephew of Emilio Aguinaldo and former Philippine Prime Minister

Critical response
Walter Goodman of The New York Times stated that the Spanish–American War "receives colorful treatment tonight [in Crucible of Empire], enlivened with period flavor, political contradictions and populist enthusiasms."

Home media
Crucible of War was first released on VHS by PBS Home Video (distributed by Warner Home Video) on November 2, 1999. PBS later released the film on DVD by October 16, 2007.

References

External links

1999 television films
1999 films
1999 documentary films
American documentary television films
Cultural depictions of Emilio Aguinaldo
Cultural depictions of William McKinley
Cultural depictions of William Randolph Hearst
Documentary films about Cuba
Documentary films about imperialism
Documentary films about war
Films about presidents of the Philippines
Films about presidents of the United States
Films about Theodore Roosevelt
PBS original programming
Philippine–American War
Spanish–American War films
1990s American films